The Church of the Immaculate Conception is a church located in Cooks Creek, Manitoba. The church was constructed from 1930 to 1938 by the Ukrainian Canadian priest and architect Philip Ruh. It was designated a Manitoba Provincial Heritage Site in 1986 and a National Historic Site in 1997.

History
The Cook's Creek Parish of the Ukrainian Greek Catholic Church was established in 1929. Philip Ruh, a Ukrainian Canadian Catholic priest and architect, was appointed the parish priest and tasked with designing a church that would replace two smaller churches in the area. Construction of the church began in 1930 and was finished in 1938, whereupon work on the church's interiors began. The church was consecrated in 1952. A grotto modeled after that of Sanctuary of Our Lady of Lourdes in France was constructed next to the church in 1954.

Preservation
It was added to the Canadian Register of Historic Places on 14 July 2009.

Architecture
The Church of the Immaculate Conception was designed by Ruh in an eclectic style combining elements from Kievan Rus', Byzantine, and Gothic architecture. Architectural historians Basil Rotoff, Roman Yereniuk, and Stella Hryniuk note that the profile of the church overall resembles Kievan Rus' churches found in eastern Ukraine but is punctuated with Romanesque windows and a Gothic portico.

It has nine domes and cupolas above the cross's arms, flanking the arms, and above the center of the church.

References

Sources
 
 

Churches in Manitoba
Ukrainian Catholic churches in Canada
Churches completed in 1938
20th-century Roman Catholic church buildings
20th-century churches in Canada